9X was an Indian Hindi general entertainment channel based in Mumbai. It is owned by Zee Entertainment Enterprises Ltd. (ZEEL). The channel was launched on 12 November 2007 in India as the flagship of the INX Network.

History

Sale to Zee Enterprises
On 8 March 2010, it was reported that Zee Entertainment Enterprises Ltd. had made a bid of Rs 650 million for 9X, who owe Rs 1.30 billion to creditors. The 9X Media acquired the deal with the creditors. On 20 April 2010, Zee Enterprises confirmed that it had secured an in-principle approval from its board for acquisition of 9X, under a Scheme of Arrangement, subject to appropriate statutory and regulatory approvals. On 29 April 2010, ZEE Network's board of directors has approved the Scheme of Arrangement between ZEEL and 9X Media, former owners of 9X.

Shutdown
The channel ceased all its operations on 10 August 2009 in UK, where the ongoing shows were shifted to its sister music channel 9XM, making it a hybrid channel. The channel ceased all its operations on 13 April 2015 in India as it stopped airing new content since 2009 and aired re-runs most of Zee TV shows. The channel even suffered losses due to lack of GRP and viewership.

Programming
The following is a list of all programs broadcast on 9X before it ceased all its operations.

Ajeeb
Baatein Dil Se
Babban Bhai v/s Bimla Tai
Begum
Bikhray Pal
Biwi O Biwi
Black
Bollywood Full N Final
Chak De Bachche
Chak De Shehar Di Kudiyan Te Galli De Gunde 
Chandini Raatein
Dahhej
Dhak Dhak In Dubai
Dhamaal Express
Dhoom Pichak Jhoom
Dil Se Dil Tak 
Devraani Jethani
Gladrags - Mrs. India 2009
Good Morning Zindagi
Jai Maa Vaishno Devi
Jalwa Four 2 Ka 1
Jamegi Jodi.Com
Jiya Jale
Kahaani Hamaaray Mahaabhaarat Ki
Kahe Naa Kahe
Kaun Jeetega Bollywood Ka Ticket
Kissmet Ka Khel
Kuchh Kook Hota Hai
Kya Dill Mein Hai
Mere Apne
Mission Ustaad
Music Express
Narayan Seva Sanstha
Neelanjanaa
Prerna
Rasm-e-Rasoi
Remote Control
Rocking Ragas
Rubi
Sai Bhakton Ki Sachchi Kahaniyan
Sai Ki Mahima
Sambhav Kya?
Suprabhaat
Tyohaar Dhamaaka
Veeranwali
Yeh Hai Jalwa
Zara Sa Jhoom Lo

References

Zee Entertainment Enterprises
Television stations in Mumbai
Television channels and stations established in 2007
Defunct television channels in India
Television channels and stations disestablished in 2015
9X Media
2015 disestablishments in India
2007 establishments in Maharashtra